Arrivano i bersaglieri is a 1980 Italian historical-comedy film written and directed by Luigi Magni. The film is set during the days of the capture of Rome (1870), an event that marked the Italian unification and the end of the Papal States and of the temporal power of the Popes.

Cast 
 Ugo Tognazzi: Don Prospero 
 Giovanna Ralli: Nunziatina, the maid
 Ombretta Colli: Costanza, Don Prospero's wife
 : Olimpia 
 Vittorio Mezzogiorno: Don Alfonso dell'Aquila d'Aragona 
 Pippo Franco: Father Paolo 
 : Gustavo Martini
 Mariano Rigillo: Alfonso La Marmora 
 Carlo Bagno: Pope Pius IX 
 Daniele Dublino: Don Pietro 
 Ricky Tognazzi: Urbano, Prospero's child

References

External links

1980 films
Commedia all'italiana
Films directed by Luigi Magni
Films scored by Armando Trovajoli
Films set in Rome
Films critical of the Catholic Church
1980s historical comedy films
1980 comedy films
1980s Italian films